Omar R. Khan (born February 7, 1977) is an American football executive who is the general manager of the Pittsburgh Steelers of the National Football League (NFL). Prior to serving with the Steelers, Khan previously served with the New Orleans Saints for four seasons.

Early years
Khan was born and raised in New Orleans, Louisiana. His mother is a native of Honduras and his father is from India. After graduating in 1994 from Archbishop Rummel High School in Metairie, he matriculated to Tulane University from which he earned a degree in Sports Management with a minor in Business Administration in 3 years.

Executive career

Tulane
As a student, Khan worked with the Tulane football team as an undergraduate assistant.

New Orleans Saints
In 1997, Khan was hired by the New Orleans Saints to serve in their football operations department. Khan previously served as a scouting and personnel intern with the Saints while he was a student at Tulane.

Pittsburgh Steelers
In 2001, Khan was hired by the Pittsburgh Steelers to serve as their football operations coordinator in their football operations and player personnel department. In that role he has helped to assemble two Super Bowl winners.  Along with general manager Kevin Colbert, in 20 seasons they have drafted and signed/extended over 30 Pro Bowl players. In 2011, Khan was promoted to director of football administration and in 2016, he was promoted to vice president of football and business administration. In 2022, Steelers President Art Rooney II hired Omar Khan as the team's new general manager and successor to Kevin Colbert.

References

1977 births
Living people
American football executives
American people of Honduran descent
American people of Indian descent
National Football League general managers
New Orleans Saints executives
Pittsburgh Steelers executives
Sportspeople from Louisiana
Tulane University alumni